Marko Djurović (Russian: Марко Джурович; born 2 May 1988 in Montenegro) is a Montenegrin footballer who last played for FK Lovćen in his home country.

Club career
Djurović started his senior career with FK Lovćen. In 2010, he signed for Sheriff Tiraspol in the Moldovan National Division, where he made over eighteen appearances and scored two goals. After that, he played for FK Mogren, FK Mladost Velika Obarska, FK Mornar and Kazkhstan side Akzhayik.

References

External links 
 After Kazakhstan, Cetinje goal scorer Marko Đurović is ready for new challenges 
 Marko Dzhurovich: “Last year, Akzhayik retained a place in the Premier League - I see no reason not to do it now”
 Marko Dzhurovich: “Sheriff” only plays for victory in every match"
 Djurovic: Victory over the future champion means a lot to us 
 Djurovic: We are not giving up, it is time for the first triumph in Grblja

1988 births
Living people
Association football forwards
Montenegrin footballers
FK Lovćen players
FC Sheriff Tiraspol players
FK Mogren players
FK Mladost Velika Obarska players
FK Mornar players
FC Akzhayik players
Montenegrin First League players
Moldovan Super Liga players
Kazakhstan Premier League players
Montenegrin expatriate footballers
Expatriate footballers in Moldova
Montenegrin expatriate sportspeople in Moldova
Expatriate footballers in Kazakhstan
Montenegrin expatriate sportspeople in Kazakhstan